Trampolino di Pakstall is a ski jumping normal hill in Gallio, Italy.

History
It was opened in 1983 and owned by Sci Club Gallio. It hosted one FIS Ski jumping World Cup event in 1988. Uroš Peterka holds the hill record.

World Cup

Men

References

External links

Ski jumping venues in Italy
Sport in Italy
Sports venues completed in 1983